Joseph Phuong Nguyen (born March 25, 1957) is a Canadian prelate of the Roman Catholic Church. On June 1, 2016, Nguyen became the Bishop-elect of the Diocese of Kamloops. Prior to his appointment, Nguyen held the post of Vicar General for the Archdiocese of Vancouver, second to Archbishop Miller.

Background 
Born in Vietnam on March 27, 1957, Nguyen had the experience of growing up in a communist country that restricted the faith of its citizens. Nguyen felt a deep love for God from a young age, beginning minor seminary at age 11. When the communist government took control of Catholic institutions, Nguyen continued to live out his office and was imprisoned multiple times for training catechists.

Emigration 
Nguyen realized that there would be no opportunity to be ordained a priest in Vietnam and secretly attempted to flee the country, nearly losing his life in the process. He was captured and imprisoned by the government, suffering torture and malnutrition from the hands of his oppressors. He escaped but was shortly thereafter injured in an auto accident, remaining in a coma for several months in the Philippines. He came to Canada in 1987 as a refugee and studied English as a second language, eventually being accepted at the Seminary of Christ the King in Mission.

Ordination 
Joseph Nguyen was ordained as a priest in Holy Rosary Cathedral on May 30, 1992.

Current affairs 
On June 1, 2016, Pope Francis appointed Joseph Nguyen as the Bishop for the Diocese of Kamloops.

References 

1957 births
Living people
Vietnamese refugees
Vietnamese emigrants to Canada
Torture victims
21st-century Roman Catholic bishops in Canada
Roman Catholic bishops of Kamloops